Mandarin High School (MHS) is a public high school in Jacksonville, Florida, United States. It was established in 1990 and is part of the Duval County Public Schools district.

As of 2010, it is the second-largest high school in Duval County following Sandalwood High School. Atlantic Coast High School opened in 2010 to prevent overcrowding at the school as well as Sandalwood, Englewood and Wolfson.

Academics 
Mandarin High School offers the Advanced International Certificate of Education (AICE) program along with Advanced Placement courses. It provides a Medical Academy certified by the state of Florida and as of 2012, it offers Advancement Via Individual Determination (AVID) to incoming freshmen. It also offers the dual enrollment program in partnership with the Florida State College at Jacksonville (FSCJ).

Athletics 
Mandarin High School offers a variety of sports. During the fall, it offers women's bowling, men's 11-man tackle football, men's and women's cross country, men's and women's swimming, men's and women's golf, women's slow pitch softball, and women's volleyball. During the winter season, it offers co-ed wrestling, men's and women's basketball, women's weightlifting, and men's and women's soccer. Spring sports include women's fast pitch softball, men's baseball, men's and women's lacrosse, men's and women's tennis, and women's flag football. The only summer season sport appears to be its marching band program which is open to boys and girls. The season starts in the summer and carries into the fall.

The school has an outdoor pool which is used by the athletic teams and for those in physical education classes during the academic year. It is available for public use as a neighborhood pool, operated by the City of Jacksonville Parks & Recreation Department, during the summer months.

Notable alumni 
 Tony Carter, NFL player
 Jeff Chandler, NFL player
 Sam Cowart, NFL player
 Charles James, NFL player
 Kensey McMahon, Competitive swimmer
 Michelle Moultrie, Professional Softball Player
 Fred Weary, NFL player

References

External links 
 

Duval County Public Schools
High schools in Jacksonville, Florida
Public high schools in Florida
Educational institutions established in 1990
1990 establishments in Florida